The Cape York striped blind snake (Anilios chamodracaena) is a species of snake in the Typhlopidae family. It is endemic to northern Queensland, Australia.

References

Anilios
Snakes of Australia
Reptiles of Queensland
Endemic fauna of Australia
Reptiles described in 1993
Taxa named by Jeanette Covacevich
Taxa named by Glen Joseph Ingram